Sheridan Scott is the former Commissioner of Competition (2004–09) of the Competition Bureau of Canada. She joined the Ottawa office of law firm Bennett Jones in March 2009 after leaving the Bureau. 

A 1981 graduate in law from the University of Victoria, Scott is a member of the Law Society of Upper Canada. She worked for the Canadian Radio-television and Telecommunications Commission (CRTC), the Canadian Broadcasting Corporation, and Bell Canada before being appointed to the Competition Bureau.

External links
 Biography of Sheridan Scott

21st-century Canadian civil servants
Canadian educators
Lawyers in Ontario
Academic staff of Carleton University
Living people
Year of birth missing (living people)
Academic staff of the University of Ottawa
University of Victoria alumni
University of Victoria Faculty of Law alumni